Germane is the chemical compound with the formula GeH4, and the germanium analogue of methane. It is the simplest germanium hydride and one of the most useful compounds of germanium. Like the related compounds silane and methane, germane is tetrahedral. It burns in air to produce GeO2 and water. Germane is a group 14 hydride.

Occurrence
Germane has been detected in the atmosphere of Jupiter.

Synthesis
Germane is typically prepared by reduction of germanium oxides, notably germanates, with hydride reagents such as sodium borohydride, potassium borohydride, lithium borohydride, lithium aluminium hydride, sodium aluminium hydride. The reaction with borohydrides is catalyzed by various acids and can be carried out in either aqueous or organic solvent.  On laboratory scale, germane can be prepared by the reaction of Ge(IV) compounds with these hydride reagents. A typical synthesis involved the reaction of potassium germanate with sodium borohydride.

NaHGeO3  +  KBH4  +  H2O  → KGeH3 + KB(OH)4
 KGeH3  +  HO2CCH3  →   GeH4  +  KO2CCH3

Other methods for the synthesis of germane include electrochemical reduction  and a plasma-based method.  The electrochemical reduction method involves applying voltage to a germanium metal cathode immersed in an aqueous electrolyte solution and an anode counter-electrode composed of a metal such as molybdenum or cadmium. In this method, germane and hydrogen gases evolve from the cathode while the anode reacts to form solid molybdenum oxide or cadmium oxides. The plasma synthesis method involves bombarding germanium metal with hydrogen atoms (H) that are generated using a high frequency plasma source to produce germane and digermane.

Reactions
Germane is weakly acidic. In liquid ammonia GeH4 is ionised forming NH4+ and GeH3−. With alkali metals in liquid ammonia GeH4 reacts to give white crystalline MGeH3 compounds. The potassium (potassium germyl KGeH3) and rubidium compounds (rubidium germyl RbGeH3) have the sodium chloride structure implying a free rotation of the GeH3− anion, the caesium compound, CsGeH3 in contrast has the distorted sodium chloride structure of TlI.

Use in semiconductor industry
The gas decomposes near 600K (327°C; 620°F) to germanium and hydrogen. Because of its thermal lability, germane is used in the semiconductor industry for the epitaxial growth of germanium by MOVPE or chemical beam epitaxy. Organogermanium precursors (e.g. isobutylgermane, alkylgermanium trichlorides, and dimethylaminogermanium trichloride) have been examined as less hazardous liquid alternatives to germane for deposition of Ge-containing films by MOVPE.

Safety
Germane is a highly flammable, potentially pyrophoric, and a highly toxic gas.  In 1970, the American Conference of Governmental Industrial Hygienists (ACGIH) published the latest changes and set the occupational exposure threshold limit value at 0.2 ppm for an 8-hour time weighted average.
The LC50 for rats at 1 hour of exposure is 622 ppm. Inhalation or exposure may result in malaise, headache, dizziness, fainting, dyspnea, nausea, vomiting, kidney injury, and hemolytic effects.

The US Department of Transportation hazard class is 2.3 Poisonous Gas.

References

External links

Metaloids (manufacturer) datasheet
Arkonic Specialty Gases China (manufacturer) datasheet
Licensintorg Russia (process technology sale) 
Honjo Chemical Japan (manufacturer) 
Praxair datasheet
Air liquide gas encyclopedia entry 
CDC - NIOSH Pocket Guide to Chemical Hazards
Voltaix (manufacturer) datasheet 
Foshan Huate Gas Co.,Ltd. (manufacturer)
Horst Technologies, Russia (manufacturer)

Germanium(IV) compounds
Metal hydrides
Industrial gases